Noel Dunford (born December 24, 1939) was a Canadian football player who played for the Winnipeg Blue Bombers. He previously played for the St. James Rams (Intermediate).

References

1939 births
Living people
Winnipeg Blue Bombers players